Hyperbolic theory may refer to:
 Hyperbolic geometry
 The theory of hyperbolic partial differential equations